The 2003 Torridge District Council election took place on 1 May 2003 to elect members of Torridge District Council in Devon, England. The whole council was up for election after boundary changes and the council stayed under no overall control.

Election result
A newly formed group called the Community Alliance gained 9 seats on the council and they were among 17 new councillors on the council. Among the gains for the Community Alliance were 3 seats in Northam ward, a seat in Bideford South from Labour and a gain from an independent in Westward Ho!. None of the candidates for the Community Alliance were sitting councillors and the group said it aimed to "keep party politics out of local government".

Meanwhile, Labour lost both their 2 seats on the council, while the Conservatives and Greens regained 1 seat each. 8 councillors were elected without facing any opposition, but this was down from 9 at the 1999 election and 13 in 1995. Overall turnout at the election was 38.4%, up from 36.1% in 1999.

Ward results

By-elections between 2003 and 2007

Bideford South
A by-election was held in Bideford South on 4 December 2003 after the former leader of the council, Liberal Democrat Mervyn Lane, resigned from the council due to ill health.

Westward Ho!

Tamarside
Independent Kenneth James won a by-election in Tamarside on 14 July 2005 after the death of councillor Richard Broad.

Northam
Conservative Sam Robinson won a by-election in Northam on 23 November 2006 after the resignation of councillor Alan Eastwood.

References

2003
2003 English local elections
2000s in Devon